Supercross, also known as Supercross 2001, is a video game developed by Page 44 Studios and published by EA Sports for the PlayStation in 2000. It is the sequel to Supercross 2000.

Reception

The game received "average" reviews according to the review aggregation website Metacritic. Peter Suciu of NextGen said: "Much like with the Knockout Kings series [...] EA Sports has managed to almost make us forget the original, stumbling start with a much improved follow-up".

References

External links
 

2000 video games
EA Sports games
Motorcycle video games
Multiplayer and single-player video games
Page 44 Studios games
PlayStation (console) games
PlayStation (console)-only games
Racing video games
Video games developed in the United States